Foolish Heart is a 1998 Argentine, Brazilian, and French drama film directed by Héctor Babenco. The screenplay was written by Babenco and Ricardo Piglia. The film stars Miguel Ángel Solá, Maria Luísa Mendonça, and others.

The picture is based on the story by Cátulo Castillo.

Plot
The film tells of seventeen-year-old Juan (Walter Quiroz). He lives with his parents and spends time with several intellectuals who are interested in  photography.  The girlfriend of the group's money person is Ana (Maria Luísa Mendonça), and Juan is attracted to her.

Ana spent two years at a mental institution because she was considered "crazy", yet Juan sees Ana often.

Juan is training as a door-to-door salesman, but when a photographer gives him a viewfinder, it changes his life.  He's put on the path to his later success as a Hollywood director.

Cast
 Miguel Ángel Solá as Juan (adult)
 Maria Luísa Mendonça as Ana
 Walter Quiroz as Juan (young)
 Xuxa Lopes as Lilith
 Norma Aleandro as Mother
 Villanueva Cosse as Father
 Oscar Ferrigno Jr. as Martin
 Alejandro Awada
 Luis Luque

Distribution
The film was first presented at the 1998 Cannes Film Festival in May.

Release dates
 Brazil: November 13, 1998
 Argentina: December 3, 1998
 France: November 17, 1999

Awards
Nominations
 Cannes Film Festival: Golden Palm; Héctor Babenco; 1998.
 Argentine Film Critics Association Awards: Silver Condor; Best Actress, Maria Luísa Mendonça; 1999.
 Cinema Brazil, Petrópolis, Rio de Janeiro, Brazil: Cinema Brazil Grand Prize; Best Actress, Maria Luísa Mendonça; Best Cinematography, Lauro Escorel; Best Director, Héctor Babenco; 2000.

References

External links
 
 Corazón iluminado at the cinenacional.com 
 Corazón iluminado at La Nación by Claudio España 
 

1998 films
1998 drama films
Films directed by Héctor Babenco
Films scored by Zbigniew Preisner
Argentine independent films
1990s Spanish-language films
Brazilian independent films
French independent films
Films shot in Mar del Plata
1998 independent films
1990s French films